Mr. Satan is a 1938 British spy thriller, directed by Arthur B. Woods and starring James Stephenson and Chili Bouchier.  Unlike a majority of Woods' quota quickie productions of the 1930s which are believed lost, this film survives in the British Film Institute National Archive.

Plot
News correspondent Tim Garnett (Stephenson) and his photographer Connelly (Richard "Skeets" Gallagher) have been on assignment in a country on the edge of revolution.  At the airport as they wait to leave, Connelly snaps a throwaway shot of an attractive woman boarding a plane.  When the photograph is developed, they realise that the woman's male companion is Emile Zubova (Franklin Dyall), a notorious illegal arms dealer who had recently been reported as having committed suicide while on the run from agents wishing to track him down.

Connelly and Garnett start to investigate their scoop, but as they do so word gets back to Zubova that he has been photographed.  Connelly and Garnett manage to identify the woman in the picture, Jacqueline Manet (Bouchier), and trace her movements to France.  As they fly out, Zubova arranges to have their plane shot down in order to silence them.  The plane crashes, but both survive relatively unscathed.  Garnett locates Jacqueline and follows her, hoping she will lead him to Zubova.  She realises she is being tailed and challenges Garnett.  However the confrontation soon turns into mutual attraction and then love.

Having been informed of the dangerous situation by his lookout minions, Zubova has Garnett kidnapped and brought to his hideout, where plans are being made to torpedo an ocean liner in order to provoke another war from which Zubova can profit.  Jacqueline arrives at the hideout and shoots Zubova during a struggle, but is herself fatally wounded in return and dies in Garnett's arms.  Garnett is able to alert the authorities of the plot to sink the liner, the navy are put on hand to deal with the threat, and the submarine is destroyed.

Cast
 James Stephenson as Tim Garnett
 Chili Bouchier as Jacqueline Manet
 Richard "Skeets" Gallagher as Connelly
 Franklin Dyall as Emile Zubova
 Betty Lynne as Conchita
 Mary Cole as Billie
 Robert Rendel as Seymour
 Patricia Medina as Maria

External links 
 
 Mr. Satan at BFI Film & TV Database

1938 films
1938 thriller films
British thriller films
Films directed by Arthur B. Woods
British black-and-white films
1930s English-language films
1930s British films